Manuel José Yrarrázaval Larraín (1834–1896) was a Chilean lawyer and politician.

He was the eldest son of José Miguel Irarrázaval Alcalde and Trinidad Larraín y Gandarillas.

1834 births
1896 deaths
People from Santiago
Chilean people of Basque descent
Conservative Party (Chile) politicians
Chilean Ministers of the Interior
Deputies of the XIII Legislative Period of the National Congress of Chile
Deputies of the XIV Legislative Period of the National Congress of Chile
Deputies of the XV Legislative Period of the National Congress of Chile
Deputies of the XVI Legislative Period of the National Congress of Chile
Senators of the XXIV Legislative Period of the National Congress of Chile
19th-century Chilean lawyers
People of the Chilean Civil War of 1891 (Congresistas)